Thou Art That may refer to:

 Tat Tvam Asi, a Hindu aphorism
 Thou Art That (book), a book by Joseph Campbell